The 1986 Vuelta a España was the 41st edition of the Vuelta a España, one of cycling's Grand Tours. The Vuelta began in Palma de Mallorca, with a prologue individual time trial on 22 April, and Stage 10 occurred on 2 May with a stage to Palencia. The race finished in Jerez de la Frontera on 13 May.

Prologue
22 April 1986 — Palma de Mallorca to Palma de Mallorca,  (ITT)

Stage 1
23 April 1986 — Palma de Mallorca to Palma de Mallorca,

Stage 2
24 April 1986 — Barcelona to Barcelona,

Stage 3
25 April 1986 — Lleida to Zaragoza,

Stage 4
26 April 1986 — Zaragoza to Logroño,

Stage 5
27 April 1986 — Haro to Santander,

Stage 6
28 April 1986 — Santander to Lakes of Covadonga,

Stage 7
29 April 1986 — Cangas de Onís to Oviedo,

Stage 8
30 April 1986 — Oviedo to Alto del Naranco,  (ITT)

Stage 9
1 May 1986 — Oviedo – ,

Stage 10
2 May 1986 —  to Palencia,

References

1986 Vuelta a España
Vuelta a España stages